Senja Katriina Mäkitörmä (born 31 May 1994) is a Finnish athlete. She competed in the women's shot put event at the 2021 European Athletics Indoor Championships.

References

External links
 

1994 births
Living people
Finnish female shot putters
People from Lapinlahti
Sportspeople from North Savo